I've Never Been Happier is a 2009 German drama film directed by Alexander Adolph.

Cast 
 Devid Striesow - Frank Knöpfel
 Nadja Uhl - Tanja
 Jörg Schüttauf - Peter Knöpfel
 Floriane Daniel - Marie Knöpfel
 Elisabeth Trissenaar - Fritzi
  - Schlickenrieder
  - Günther
  - Dieter 
  - Bewährungshelfer Schuhmacher
  - Vorarbeiterin Putzfirma
  - Herr Lottner
  - Jeanette
  - Mietinteressentin
  - Junger Mann

References

External links 
 
 So glücklich war ich noch nie at filmportal.de (English)

2009 drama films
2009 films
German drama films
2000s German films